Oestokerkus is an extinct genus of Cambrian megacheiran arthropod known from the Emu Bay Shale of Kangaroo Island, Australia. It belongs to the family Leanchoiliidae. It had a large head shield that was more than a third of the trunk's length, as well as a large pair of eyes. The great appendages have long flagellae projecting from them. The head shield probably had two pairs of cephalic appendages. The trunk has 11 segments. The exopods of the biramous limbs are fringed with long setae. The body ended with a telson, which was probably dorsally flattened.

References 

Megacheira
Cambrian arthropods
Cambrian Series 2 first appearances
Fossil taxa described in 2011
Prehistoric arthropod genera